Rabbi Eliezer Papo (1785–1828) was the rabbi of the community of Silistra in Bulgaria (then part of the Ottoman Empire). He is famous for writing the Pele Yoetz, a work of musar (ethical) literature which gives advice on how to behave as a Jew in many aspects of life.

He was born in Saraybosna, Bosnia Eyalet of the Ottoman Empire (today Sarajevo, Bosnia). He moved at the age of 27 to Bulgaria, where he died in 1828.

He authored the Pele Yoetz, his most famous work, as well as Eleph Hamagen, Orot Eilim, Chesed L'Alaphim (on the Orach Chaim), Yaalzu Chasidim (on Sefer Chasidim), and Chodesh HaAviv.

One of his noted works is Beit Tefillah, which is filled with many different prayers for specific situations, including one for the welfare of the Jewish people. A Ladino edition was published in the 1860s, and a Hebrew version was printed in Jerusalem in 1968 (There were some additional, newer printings since).
   
His grave is up to the present day a focus of pilgrimage by observant Jews, some of whom fly especially from Israel and even from Latin America to Bulgaria for that purpose.

References

External links 
 The OU Biography on Rabbi Eliezer Papo
 Rabbi Papo's grave

1785 births
1826 deaths
Bosnia and Herzegovina Sephardi Jews
Bulgarian Orthodox rabbis
19th-century rabbis from the Ottoman Empire
People from Silistra
Writers of Musar literature
History of Silistra
Authors of books on Jewish law